Club Atlético Vianés is a Spanish football team located in the town of Viana in Navarre, but plays in autonomous community of La Rioja. Founded in 1951 it currently plays in Tercera División – Group 16, holding home matches at Estadio Municipal de Viana, with a capacity of 500 spectators.

History 
The club was founded in 1951, being the direct heir of the old team called Amayur, which disappeared in 1949.

Season to season

References 

Association football clubs established in 1951
1951 establishments in Spain
Football clubs in La Rioja (Spain)
Sport in Navarre